The Hawkins Electrical Guide was a technical engineering  book written by Nehemiah Hawkins, first published in 1914, intended to explain the highly complex principles of the new technology of electricity in a way that could be understood by the common man. The book is notable for the extremely high number of detailed illustrations it contains, and the small softbound size of the volumes.

The book was published by Theodore Audel & Company, and the majority of the illustrative content became the basis of decades of follow-up books published under the Audels brand name. The illustrative content of these books can still be found in Audels books sold new today.

Because the Hawkins Electrical Guide was printed in the United States prior to 1923, the content of the books has passed into the public domain.

Free media access on the Internet 
This series of books is currently available for free, non-commercial use from Google Books and each volume can be downloaded as a PDF, though the illustration scan quality is not as good as the ones being added to Wikipedia on this page by Wikipedia contributors.

Google Books Volume Links 
As of September 2008, Google Books does not provide a simple, direct means to find each volume of this media set, and appears to include scanned copies of different volumes from different libraries and copyright dates from 1914-1917. Scan quality varies from one volume to the next. For your convenience, links to the available scanned media are provided here:
 Volume 1, Copyright 1917, Impression 1921, from the University of California
 Volume 2, Copyright 1917, from the University of Wisconsin - Madison, General Library System
 Volume 3, Copyright 1917, Impression 1926, from the Harvard College Library
 Volume 4, Copyright 1917, from the University of Wisconsin - Madison, General Library System,
 Volume 5, Copyright 1917, from the University of Wisconsin - Madison, General Library System
 Volume 6, Copyright 1917, from the Harvard College Library
 Volume 7 & 8, Copyright 1914, from the New York Public Library
 Volume 9, Copyright 1917, Impression 1926, from the Harvard College Library
 Volume 10, Copyright 1917, Impression 1924-1925, from the Harvard College Library

Illustrations from Volume 1

Chapter 14: The Dynamo: Current Commutation

Chapter 15: Classes of Dynamo

Chapter 16: Field Magnets

Chapter 17: The Armature

Chapter 19: Theory of the Armature

Chapter 20: Commutation and the Commutator

Illustrations from Volume 2

Chapter 35: Operation of Motors

Illustrations from Volume 4

Chapter 46: Alternating Currents

Illustrations from Volume 6

Chapter 68: Wave Form Measurement

Illustrations from Volume 7

Chapter 66, Power Stations

Notes, References 
 The author's full name was Nehemiah Hawkins. Cf: Joule's Experiment. DOB 1833.
 In 1882 a Mr. N. Hawkins "writing under the name Theodore Audel" founded a magazine called "Steam". Platt's History. Another Hawkins pseudonym: William Rogers.
 Also available online:  Hawkins, Nehemiah. "Maxims and instructions for the boiler room."(1903) - Internet Archive
 Hawkins bibliography at Open Library
 Historical advertisement for the Hawkins Electrical Guide, Popular Science monthly, February 1919, Page 6, Scanned by Google Books: https://books.google.com/books?id=7igDAAAAMBAJ&pg=PA6

Electrical engineering books